is a song by Shunichi Miyamoto. It was released as Miyamoto's debut CD single by Victor Entertainment on May 7, 2003. On the Oricon weekly singles chart, it placed at number twenty-eight. The TV version of the song was used as the opening song for the anime D.N.Angel.

Track list

References

2003 singles
2003 songs